In Greek mythology, Aeneus (Ancient Greek: Αἰνεύς) or Aineus was the legendary founder of the ancient Thracian city of Aenus (also called Poltyobria or Poltymbria).

Mythology 
Aeneus was the father of Cyzicus by Aenete, daughter of Eusorus. His parentage has been given as Apollo and Stilbe, daughter of the Thessalian river-god Peneus. This would make Aeneus the brother of Lapithes and Centaurus, the founders of the ancient Lapith and Centaur tribes in Thessaly. However, this Aeneus may have been intended as the eponymous founder of the Aenianes, another Thessalian tribe, and may not be the same as the founder of the Thracian city of Aenus. Given that the ancient city of Cyzicus was said to be founded by Thessalians, this Thessalian Aeneus may have been intended as the father of the mythical person named Cyzicus, founder of the city of the same name.

Apollonius' Account 

"And about the isthmus and the plain the Doliones had their dwelling, and over them Cyzicus son of Aeneus was king, whom Aenete the daughter of goodly Eusorus bare."

Parthenius' Account 

"There are various forms of the story of Cyzicus the son of Aeneus."

Valerius' Account 

"Forth from the palace goes the crew of Argo, and along with them stream out of the city all the sons of Aeneus [i.e. Cyzicus] clinging to their dear departing comrades."

Notes

References 

 Apollonius Rhodius, Argonautica translated by Robert Cooper Seaton (1853-1915), R. C. Loeb Classical Library Volume 001. London, William Heinemann Ltd, 1912. Online version at the Topos Text Project.
 Apollonius Rhodius, Argonautica. George W. Mooney. London. Longmans, Green. 1912. Greek text available at the Perseus Digital Library.
 Gaius Valerius Flaccus, Argonautica translated by Mozley, J H. Loeb Classical Library Volume 286. Cambridge, MA, Harvard University Press; London, William Heinemann Ltd. 1928. Online version at theio.com.
 Gaius Valerius Flaccus, Argonauticon. Otto Kramer. Leipzig. Teubner. 1913. Latin text available at the Perseus Digital Library.
 Parthenius, Love Romances translated by Sir Stephen Gaselee (1882-1943), S. Loeb Classical Library Volume 69. Cambridge, MA. Harvard University Press. 1916.  Online version at the Topos Text Project.
 Parthenius, Erotici Scriptores Graeci, Vol. 1. Rudolf Hercher. in aedibus B. G. Teubneri. Leipzig. 1858. Greek text available at the Perseus Digital Library.

Mythological kings of Thrace

Kings in Greek mythology
Children of Apollo
Demigods in classical mythology
Thessalian characters in Greek mythology
Thracian characters in Greek mythology
Greek mythology of Thrace